Blaine is a city in Whatcom County, Washington, United States. The city's northern boundary is the Canada–U.S. border; the Peace Arch international monument straddles the border of both countries. The population was 5,884 at the 2020 census. Since Blaine is located right on the border with Canada, it is the northernmost city on Interstate 5.

History
The area was first settled in the mid-19th century by pioneers who established the town as a seaport for the west coast logging and fishing industries, and as a jumping off point for prospectors heading to British Columbia's gold fields. Blaine was officially incorporated on May 20, 1890, and was named after James G. Blaine (1830−1893), who was a U.S. senator from the state of Maine, Secretary of State, and, in 1884, the unsuccessful Republican presidential candidate. The city has a "turn-of-the-century" theme, marked by remodeled buildings and signs resembling designs that existed during the late 19th century and early 20th century.

The world's largest salmon cannery was operated by the Alaska Packers' Association for decades in Blaine; the cannery site has been converted to a waterfront destination resort on Semiahmoo Spit.  Several saw mills once operated on Blaine's waterfront, and much of the lumber was transported from its wharves and docks to help rebuild San Francisco following the 1906 fire there. The forests were soon logged but Blaine's fishing industry remained strong into the second half of the 20th century. Into the 1970s Blaine was home to hundreds of commercial purse seiners and gillnetters plying the waters offshore of British Columbia, between Washington state and southeast Alaska. Blaine's two large marinas are still home to hundreds of recreational sailboats and yachts. Nature lovers have always appreciated Blaine's coastal location, its accessible bike and walking trails, and view of mountains and water. Birdwatchers across the continent have discovered the area's high content of migratory birds and waterfowl:  Blaine's Drayton Harbor, Semiahmoo Spit and Boundary Bay are ranked as Important Birding Areas by the Audubon Society.

The Cains are the most notable family in Blaine's short history, credited with its founding and achievements. At one time owning most of present-day Blaine, the Cain brothers erected the biggest store north of Seattle, a lumber and shingle mill, a hotel (largest in the state at the time), the first public wharf, and donated large public tracts of land.

Nathan Cornish and family moved to Blaine in 1889.  He became mayor in 1901; his platform was "twelve miles of wooden sidewalk".  His daughter, Nellie Cornish, having failed to open a successful piano teaching business in Blaine, moved to Seattle, where she founded the Cornish College of the Arts in 1914, which still exists today.

On May 9, 1970, approximately 450 Canadian protestors demonstrating against the Cambodian campaign of the Vietnam War crossed the border and conducted a "symbolic invasion" of Blaine. Several buildings' windows were smashed, flags were torn down, and the Peace Arch was vandalized before police officers and vigilantes pushed the protestors back to the Canadian side of the border.

Geography
Blaine's motto is "Where America Begins": the community is also known as "The Gateway to the Pacific Northwest", and the "Peace Arch City". All these phrases are commentaries on Blaine's unique locale. It lies at the northernmost point of the north-south U.S. Interstate 5 and next to Drayton Harbor and Boundary Bay (the southward extension of Boundary Bay is officially named and often referred to as Semiahmoo Bay).

Blaine had a small airport, which was popular with light aircraft owners for its low fuel prices and because it had less fog than other nearby airports. The runway measured 2539 × 40 feet (774 × 12 m). The Blaine city government operated automated fuel pumps.  In the spring of 2006 the city government removed several tall trees south of the runway as a safety precaution.  Then in 2007, the City Council voted to close the airport before the end of 2008. The airport was officially closed on December 31, 2008. The land upon which the airport rests is adjacent to a shopping center and light industrial park. The area is now zoned for mixed use development, including light industrial manufacturing and commercial.

Climate

Blaine lies between the mountains east of Vancouver, the flatlands of Skagit County, Washington, the North Cascades (including Mount Baker), and the south end of Vancouver Island. Blaine has a borderline climate between mediterranean (Csb) and maritime (Cfb), which provides fairly mild weather from the rest of the Pacific Northwest.

Canada–U.S. border
Blaine is home to two main West Coast ports of entry between the United States and Canada. The Peace Arch Border Crossing, which is the northern terminus of I-5 and southern terminus of B.C. provincial Highway 99, serves as the primary passenger vehicle port of entry. The Pacific Highway Border Crossing, approximately one mile to the east, serves as the primary point of entry for heavy truck traffic, and thus is also known as the Truck Crossing. The latter is reached via Washington State Route 543 which departs I-5 on the south side of Blaine and connects at the border to B.C.'s Highway 15 (Surrey's 176th Street) and then to the Trans-Canada Highway.

Construction of a new Land Port of Entry (LPOE) was completed by the U.S. General Services Administration in 2011. A large public art installation entitled "Non-Sign II" was erected near the crossing booths. The art piece is a "blank space" in the shape of a billboard sign, surrounded by a mass of twisted metal rods. On the Canadian side, a new Port of Entry building was constructed by the Canada Border Services Agency.  It was officially opened by Public Safety Minister Peter Van Loan on August 20, 2009.  It was built partly to reduce delays for travelers coming to the 2010 Winter Olympics which were held in Vancouver and Whistler February 12–28, 2010.

International border intrigue has always been a part of Blaine's ambiance. Smuggling became an underground industry in 1919 with the passage of the Volstead Act banning liquor sale and use in the United States. Rum-running and border jumping thrived along Blaine's shared coastline with British Columbia, due in part to the area's largest whiskey still being located on Texada Island, which is located in the northern Strait of Georgia offshore from the city of Powell River, British Columbia. This continued until Prohibition was repealed in 1933 (coincidentally, the US Congressional law which re-legalized alcohol is named the Blaine Act). In subsequent decades, the situation was reversed due to restrictive drinking and entertainment laws in British Columbia, notably a ban on Sunday drinking, which led to Blaine and its sister border towns of Point Roberts and Sumas booming with taverns and adult entertainment of various kinds. Those days are long gone and now Blaine's retail sector consists of goods such as gasoline, dairy products and clothing outlets, as these goods are cheaper in the U.S.

In the 1990s, smuggling again reached a zenith with exports of high grade marijuana from neighboring British Columbia, and corresponding flow of cocaine and handguns from the United States into Canada. As the production of 'BC Bud' grew across British Columbia, a sometimes dangerous game of cat and mouse played out along Blaine's border with Canada. Smugglers used every technique, from backpacks to helicopter aerial drops to bring tons of the marijuana crop into the U.S., while a growing phalanx of local, state, provincial and federal law enforcement from both sides of the border sought ways to stem the tide. Following the terrorist attacks of 2001, the addition of hundreds of federal agents and millions of dollars in enforcement technology have pushed much of the smuggling activity into the rugged interior of Washington.

With its location at the intersection of an international border, a major interstate freeway, and the Pacific Ocean, Blaine is frequently in the news. The International Peace Arch, dedicated September 6, 1921 by founder Samuel Hill, is located in Blaine in Peace Arch State Park and is occasionally used as a focal point for peaceful demonstrations and debate, such as the annual setting of crosses for each American killed so far in the Iraq War. But most of the people who visit or pass by the Park each year remember it for its beauty and peaceful shoreline setting (although the beach is not officially accessible from the park).

The Interstate 5 freeway extends from the U.S./Mexico border at San Diego, northward to Canada, and terminates in Blaine at the city's northern border. The country's only pedestrian crosswalk to cross an Interstate freeway exists in Peace Arch State Park, the Washington portion of the binational Peace Arch Park. The Canadian side of the park, designated as Peace Arch Provincial Park, is in Douglas, the Canadian port-of-entry and part of the city of Surrey, British Columbia. The Peace Arch monument, located in the Park, symbolizes lasting peace and amity between the U.S. and Canada.  One innovative feature that has never been abrogated even during the days since 9/11 is that people entering the Park from either side may have the unique experience of strolling to the opposite park's boundary amid flowers, ponds, and works of art, without having to go through Immigration, thus truly making the Park a place of bi-national mingling. Frequently, wedding ceremonies are performed in the Park.

In 2006, a local group called the Blaine Peace Alliance unsuccessfully solicited City Council support to formalize a sister-city relationship with Pugwash, Nova Scotia, where promotion of world peace had been an ongoing effort for 50 years. Because Pugwash affiliated itself with the Pugwash Conferences on Science and World Affairs, the Council ruled such a connection would be "political". Shortly thereafter, the Alliance disbanded.

Since 1937, an annual celebration known as "Hands Across the Border" has been held at the Park, sponsored by the International Peace Arch Association. Hundreds of Scouts from the U.S. and Canada are in attendance and the highways and Ports of Entry on both sides of the border are closed for several hours for the event. There is a procession of Troops and world flags through the Peace Arch, signifying Scout unity around the world. Speeches are made by honored Scouts from Washington and British Columbia, and State, Provincial and local dignitaries attend. On February 28, 2013, after 90 years, the event's former organizers announced that "Hands Across the Border" had been cancelled. However, following public support the annual program was re-established in 2015.

Demographics

The city's population has been exaggerated at times: "Population now 1,735 as against peak of 14,000 in the 1920s", declared the December 27, 1964 issue of the Seattle Post-Intelligencer.

2010 census
As of the census of 2010, there were 4,684 people, 1,994 households, and 1,291 families residing in the city. The racial makeup of the city was 86.5% White, 1.4% African American, 0.9% Native American, 5.1% Asian, 1.3% Pacific Islander, 0.7% from other races, and 4.2% from two or more races. Hispanic or Latino of any race were 5.0% of the population.

There were 1,994 households, of which 27.1% had children under the age of 18 living with them, 49.5% were married couples living together, 11.0% had a female householder with no husband present, 4.2% had a male householder with no wife present, and 35.3% were non-families. 30.1% of all households were made up of individuals, and 12% had someone living alone who was 65 years of age or older. The average household size was 2.32 and the average family size was 2.85.

The median age in the city was 44.3 years. 21.4% of residents were under the age of 18; 7.4% were between the ages of 18 and 24; 22% were from 25 to 44; 30.1% were from 45 to 64; and 19.1% were 65 years of age or older. The gender makeup of the city was 49.1% male and 50.9% female.

2000 census
As of the census of 2000, there were 3,770 people, 1,496 households, and 1,036 families residing in the city. The population density was 680.4 people per square mile (262.7/km). There were 1,737 housing units at an average density of 313.5 per square mile (121.1/km). The racial makeup of the city was 87.72% White, 1.19% African American, 1.14% Native American, 4.19% Asian, 0.66% Pacific Islander, 1.33% from other races, and 3.77% from two or more races. Hispanic or Latino of any race were 4.35% of the population.

There were 1,496 households, out of which 32.1% had children under the age of 18 living with them, 52.9% were married couples living together, 12.4% had a female householder with no husband present, 4% had a male householder with no wife present, and 30.7% were non-families. 25.5% of all households were made up of individuals, and 10.1% had someone living alone who was 65 years of age or older. The average household size was 2.48 and the average family size was 2.96.

In the city, the age distribution of the population shows 26.5% under the age of 18, 6.9% from 18 to 24, 26.4% from 25 to 44, 25.7% from 45 to 64, and 14.4% who were 65 years of age or older. The median age was 39 years. For every 100 females, there were 94.5 males. For every 100 females age 18 and over, there were 90.2 males.

The median income for a household in the city was $36,900, and the median income for a family was $45,056. Males had a median income of $36,381 versus $23,561 for females. The per capita income for the city was $20,333. About 10.2% of families and 15.5% of the population were below the poverty line, including 16.6% of those under age 18 and 8.3% of those age 65 or over.

Economy
Much of Blaine's economy is based on cross-border Canadian trade. The eastern side of the city accommodates a number of import/export warehouses, freight and courier services and gas stations serving long-haul cargo trucks. The Customs and Border Protection branch of the Department of Homeland Security operates two border inspection stations in Blaine. The Blaine Sector Headquarters of the US Border Patrol employs hundreds of federal law enforcement officers and support staff in the community.

Blaine also has a number of manufacturing companies, including Nature's Path cereal and Totally Chocolate.

The Port of Bellingham operates a large marina in Blaine, serving a variety of pleasure craft and fishing vessels.

As Vancouver, British Columbia is just north of Blaine, across the US-Canada border and where several prime-time television series are recorded, several dozen US actors/actresses have rented houses in Blaine and commute to Vancouver rather than rent houses and apartments in Vancouver, which is much more expensive. Included series are: Once Upon A Time, Beauty and the Beast, Supernatural and Nikita.  For similar reasons, a significant number of Americans who work for companies in Vancouver are living in Blaine.

The United States Consulate in Vancouver has a Blaine address for mail from the U.S.. Several mail service companies have opened branches in Blaine, targeting Canadian residents looking to avoid cross-border shipping costs. The local industry grew during the rise of e-commerce in the early 2000s and the city set up a sales tax that earns $1.7 million in annual revenue.

Notable people
James Cain, Town proprietor, first mayor, first post master, first notary of public, first school teacher. 
 Carlos Becerra, actor from Carspotting on Discovery
Luke Ridnour, retired NBA player

School district

Blaine School District #503 serves a population which extends to the south end of nearby Birch Bay, well beyond the city limits of Blaine.  The largest share of school services is consolidated on a large (quarter mile square) campus in central Blaine.  Approximately 2,500 students of all grades (K–12) attend school in facilities which separately house K–2, 3–5, 6–8, and 9–12th grades respectively.  Students from the small nearby exclave of Point Roberts, Washington above 3rd grade are bused through the border to Blaine to attend school.

References

External links

 
 
 History of Blaine at HistoryLink
 Blaine Washington Community Web Portal
 Bellingham-Whatcom Chamber of Commerce & Industry
 Blaine Community Newspaper
 Blaine Community Chamber of Commerce
 Whatcom County Library System, serving Blaine and surrounding areas
 Peace Arch International Park
 Fishboats in Blaine Harbour, 1954, U.Wash Digital Collections
 NYTimes feature, 2010

Cities in Washington (state)
Populated places established in 1890
Cities in Whatcom County, Washington
1890 establishments in Washington (state)